This is a list of notable painters from, or associated with, Bosnia and Herzegovina.

B
 Mersad Berber (1940-2012)

D
 Braco Dimitrijević (born 1948)
 Vojo Dimitrijević (1910-1980)
 Lazar Drljača (1881-1970)

H
 Kosta Hakman (1899-1961)

J
 Gabrijel Jurkić (1886-1974)

K
 Daniel Kabiljo (1894-1944)
 Kristian Kreković (1901-1985)
 Maya Kulenovic (born 1975) (Canada)

M
 Svetislav Mandić (1921-2003)
 Karlo Mijić (1887-1964)
 Ksenia Milicevic (born 1942) (France)

O
 Daniel Ozmo (1912-1942)

P
 Slobodan Pejić (1944-2006)
 Roman Petrović (1896-1947)

S
 Petar Šain (1885-1965)
 Todor Švrakić (1882-1931)

T
 Nesim Tahirović (1941-2020)

Z
 Safet Zec (born 1943)

See also
 List of Bosnian and Herzegovinian people

 
Bosnia and Herzegovina
Painters